Lutjanidae, or snappers are a family of perciform fish, mainly marine, but with some members inhabiting estuaries, feeding in fresh water. The family includes about 113 species. Some are important food fish. One of the best known is the red snapper.

Snappers inhabit tropical and subtropical regions of all oceans. Most are active carnivores, feeding on crustaceans or other fish, though a few are plankton-feeders. They can be kept in aquaria, but mostly grow too fast to be popular aquarium fish.

As with other fish, snappers harbour parasites. A detailed study conducted in New Caledonia has shown that coral reef-associated snappers harbour about 9 species of parasites per fish species.

Timeline
Gibola

Systematics
Lutjanidae is subdivided into four subfamilies and 17 genera with around 110 species, as follows:

 subfamily Apsilinae Johnson, 1980
 genus Apsilus Valenciennes, 1830
 genus Lipocheilus Anderson, Talwar & Johnson, 1977
 genus Paracaesio Bleeker, 1875
 genus Parapristipomoides Kami, 1963
 subfamily Etelinae Gill, 1893
 genus Aphareus Cuvier, 1870
 genus Aprion Valenciennes, 1830
 genus Etelis Cuvier, 1828
 genus Pristipomoides Bleeker, 2020
 genus Randallichthys Anderson, Kami & Johnson, 1977
 subfamily Lutjaninae Gill, 1861
 genus Hoplopagrus Gill, 1861
 genus Lutjanus Bloch, 1790
 genus Macolor Bleeker, 1860
 genus Ocyurus Gill, 1862
 genus Pinjalo Bleeker, 1873
 genus Rhomboplites Gill, 1862
 subfamily Paradicichthyinae Whitley, 1930
 genus Symphorichthys Munro, 1967
 genus Symphorus Günther, 1872

Some authorities classify the Caesionidae, the fusiliers, within the Lutjanidae as a fifth subfamily but the 5th Edition of Fishes of the World retains this grouping as a distinct family pending more work being conducted on its relationships.

References

 
Commercial fish
Ray-finned fish families